The 2019–20 W-League season was the twelfth season of the W-League, the Australian national women's association football competition. Nine teams competed in the league, with most of the players from Australia but 33 of them from 11 other countries.

Melbourne City was undefeated through the regular season, the third time this has occurred in the W-League and the second time it has been achieved by Melbourne City.

The 2019–20 Australian bushfire season has had a significant impact on the season. Apart from the need to defer a few matches, there were a number of matches that were played in a smoke haze, with some players requiring asthma medication during the matches.

The grand final was played behind closed doors, due to the impacts from the COVID-19 pandemic in Australia.

The season was also notable for the number of high-profile players who left the W-League to join English teams. This included Sam Kerr moving to Chelsea, Hayley Raso to Everton, Caitlin Foord to Arsenal and Chloe Logarzo to Bristol City.

Clubs

Stadia and locations

Personnel and kits

Managerial changes

Transfers

Foreign players

The following do not fill a Visa position:
A Australian citizens who have chosen to represent another national team;
G Guest Players;
R Injury Replacement Players, or National Team Replacement Players

Regular season 
The regular season runs from 14 November 2019 to 1 March 2020, including a two-week break at the end of January and beginning of February. The season consists of 12 matches per team, 6 home and 6 away, usually with one match per week for each team. Because the league has an odd number of teams, at least one team each week does not play. In most weeks, the league has scheduled one match on Thursday and the remaining matches on Saturday and Sunday. To date, two matches have had to be rescheduled due to bushfires, either because of direct fire threat or because of smoke.

League table

Results

Fixtures

Round 1

Round 2

Round 3

Round 4

Round 5

Round 6

Round 7

Round 8

Round 9

Round 10

Round 11

Round 12

Round 13

Round 14

Finals series
The grand final was played behind closed doors, due to the impacts from the COVID-19 pandemic in Australia.

Semi-finals

Grand final

Regular season statistics

Top scorers

Own goals

Hat-tricks

Clean sheets

Monthly awards

End-of-season awards
The following end of the season awards were announced at the 2019–20 Dolan Warren Awards night on 23 July 2020.
 Julie Dolan Medal – Kristen Hamilton (Western Sydney Wanderers)
 NAB Young Footballer of the Year – Ellie Carpenter (Melbourne City)
 Golden Boot Award – Morgan Andrews (Perth Glory), Kristen Hamilton (Western Sydney Wanderers), Remy Siemsen (Sydney FC), and Natasha Dowie (Melbourne Victory) (7 goals)
 Goalkeeper of the Year – Aubrey Bledsoe (Sydney FC) and Lydia Williams (Melbourne City)
 Coach of the Year – Rado Vidošić (Melbourne City)
 Fair Play Award – Melbourne Victory, Newcastle Jets, and Perth Glory
 Referee of the Year – Rebecca Durcau
 Goal of the Year – Amy Jackson (Melbourne Victory v Perth Glory, 28 December 2019)

International competition

The W-League was represented in the first edition of the AFC Women's Club Championship, which took place from 26 to 30 November 2019 in Yongin, South Korea. Melbourne Victory were invited to participate in the tournament, as the Premiers of the 2018–19 season. They finished in last place with one point from their 3 matches.

As Premiers in 2019–20, Melbourne City qualify to the 2020 AFC Women's Club Championship.

See also

 W-League transfers for 2019–20 season
 2019–20 Adelaide United W-League season
 2019–20 Melbourne City W-League season
 2019–20 Melbourne Victory W-League season
 2019–20 Newcastle Jets W-League season
 2019–20 Perth Glory W-League season
 2019–20 Sydney FC W-League season

Notes

References

Australia
2019–20 W-League (Australia)
2019–20